Vladimir Jovančić (born 31 May 1987) is a Bosnian Serb former professional footballer who played as a forward.

Club career
Jovančić started his professional career with BASK, spending two seasons at Careva Ćuprija. In the summer of 2007, he moved to Rad. Jovančić spent four seasons at Banjica, scoring 16 goals in the top flight from 2008 to 2011. On 3 June 2011, he officially signed a three-year contract with Partizan. However, after only six months, Jovančić left Partizan for K League outfit Seongnam Ilhwa Chunma. In July 2012, he joined Chinese Super League side Tianjin Teda on a six-month loan deal. Jovančić also played there in the 2013 season. In the summer of 2014, he returned to Serbia by signing with Jagodina.

Club statistics

Personal life
He is nephew of Rade Bogdanović.

References

External links
 
 

1987 births
Living people
Footballers from Sarajevo
Serbs of Bosnia and Herzegovina
Serbian footballers
Bosnia and Herzegovina footballers
Association football forwards
FK BASK players
FK Rad players
FK Partizan players
Seongnam FC players
Tianjin Jinmen Tiger F.C. players
FK Jagodina players
Second League of Serbia and Montenegro players
Serbian SuperLiga players
K League 1 players
Chinese Super League players
Serbian expatriate footballers
Expatriate footballers in South Korea
Serbian expatriate sportspeople in South Korea
Expatriate footballers in China
Serbian expatriate sportspeople in China